Search and destroy is a military strategy that became a notorious element of the Vietnam War.

Search and Destroy or Seek and Destroy may also refer to:

Military
Sense and Destroy ARMor or Seek and Destroy ARMor, a U.S. submunition capable of searching for and destroying tanks
"Seek and Destroy", the motto of No. 41 Squadron RAF

Games
Search & Destroy: Tactical Combat Vietnam 1965-1966, a 1975 board wargame
Seek and Destroy (1996 video game), a game developed by Safari Software and published by Epic Megagames
Seek and Destroy (2002 video game), an action game developed by Takara

Music
"Search and Destroy" (The Stooges song), 1973, notably covered by the Red Hot Chili Peppers and Skunk Anansie
"Search and Destroy" (Thirty Seconds to Mars song), 2009
"Seek & Destroy", a 1983 song by Metallica from  the album Kill 'Em All, with a chorus lyric of "Searching - seek and destroy."
"Seek and Destroy", a 1989 song by Geto Boys from Grip It! On That Other Level
"Seek and Destroy", a 2006 song by Kasabian from Empire
"Search & Destroy", a 1995 song by KMFDM from Nihil
"Seek and Destroy", a 1983 song by Raven from All for One
"Seek & Destroy", a 2022 song by SZA from SOS

Other uses
Search and Destroy (novel), a spy novel by Tom Clancy with Peter Telep
Search & Destroy (punk zine), a zine published by V. Vale from 1977 to 1979 and succeeded by RE/Search
Search and Destroy (1979 film), a 1979 Canuxploitation film
Search and Destroy (1995 film), a film by David Salle and starring Dennis Hopper
Search and Destroy, a play by Howard Korder and the basis for the film
Search and Destroy (Person of Interest), a 2015 episode of Person of Interest
"Seek and Destroy" (Captain Scarlet), a 1968 episode of Captain Scarlet and the Mysterons
Spybot – Search & Destroy, a spyware and adware removal program for Microsoft Windows systems